The Capture of Delhi was a battle in 1771 when the forces of the Maratha Empire led by Mahadaji Shinde captured Delhi along with the Red Fort, and giving Mughal Emperor Shah Alam II the throne back with treaty. The Marathas captured Delhi from Najib Khan who wads put in charge by the Afghans. With this battle Marathas regained their lost supremacy in North India after the Third Battle of Panipat and conquered much of the lost territories which they lost after the Third Battle of Panipat.

In the Third Battle of Panipat, the Maratha Empire suffered a serious blow at the hands of the Muslim axis of the Durrani Empire, Nawab of Awadh, and Rohillas under Najib ad-Dawlah. After the death of Peshwa Balaji Baji Rao Bhat, Madhavrao I became Peshwa under the regency of Raghunathrao Bhat. Mahadji Shinde's victory over Jats of Mathura, Rajputs of Rajasthan and Pashtun-Rohillas of Rohilkhand (in the western part of present-day Uttar Pradesh state) re-established the Marathas in the northern India.

Aftermath 
After taking control of Delhi, Marathas sent a large army in 1772 to "punish" Afghan Rohillas for siding with the Durrani Empire at Panipat a decade ago. Maratha army devastated Rohilkhand by looting and plundering and also took the members of royal family as captives. Maratha general Mahadaji was “very much pleased with the revenge taken by his men” for Panipat. Najib Khan's son and Nawab of Rohilkhand Zabita Khan was defeated by the Marathas, led by Mahadaji Sindhia alias Shinde in 1772 and the fort of Pathargarh (Najibabad) was completely looted by the Marathas in the form of horses, elephants, guns and other valuable things, to avenge the deaths of Maratha warriors who fell in the battle of Delhi and Panipat. Marathas also destroyed grave of Najib, scattering his bones all around.

References 

Delhi
Delhi